Yoo Byung-Soo (born 26 March 1988) is a South Korean football striker who plays for Chonburi in Thai League 1.

He has been nicknamed the "Ronaldo of Wolmido", because of his spinless free-kick that resembles that of Cristiano Ronaldo's. Wolmido is a small park in Incheon city, where he started his professional career.

Club career

Youth career
Yoo entered Dunchun Middle School, scoring at least one goal in nearly every match he played in. Then he entered Unnam High School, winning the top scorer award in a couple of national competitions. After graduating from high school, he decided to enter Hong-Ik University, winning the top assists award in National University Competition. Thus having grabbed the attention of many scouts, he joined K-League side Incheon United.

Incheon United
In the pre-season, Incheon sold its franchise star striker Bang Seung-Hwan to Jeju United. This transfer worried many Incheon fans as they had already sold another striker Dženan Radončić to Seongnam Ilhwa. However, Incheon's newly appointed manager Ilija Petković said that Yoo Byung-Soo could be the replacement, and he can develop into a new franchise star for Incheon.

On 3 March 2009, Yoo scored in his senior debut match against Busan I'Park. In his debut season in K-League, he was widely regarded as one of the best candidates for the Rookie of the Season award but eventually Gangwon FC's forward Kim Young-Hoo grabbed the award. In November 2009, he was linked with Premier League side Bolton Wanderers.

In the 2010 K-League season, he scored 22 goals in 28 appearances, and was named 2010 K-League top scorer, Yoo signed a contract extension with Incheon United, running until 2013.

Al Hilal
In July 2011, Yoo signed a new contract with the Asian club of the century, Al Hilal in Saudi Arabia, running until 2014. He scored a total of 16 goals while playing 44 league matches in two seasons for the Riyadh-based team.

Rostov
On 22 June 2013, Al Hilal announced that Yoo had agreed on a transfer to a Russian Premier League side FC Rostov.

Return to Korea 
In 2017, Yoo joined Gimpo Citizen FC for public service work. During August 2018, Yoo spent time on trial with A-League side Wellington Phoenix; scoring in a 5–0 friendly victory over Napier City Rovers on 24 August.

In 2019, Yoo signed with K3 League team Hwaseong FC.

International career
On June 3, 2009, he played his first senior game against Oman national football team, as a second-half substitute.
Yoo was selected to take part in the Asian Cup 2011 in Qatar.

Club career statistics

Honours

As a player
Al-Hilal
 Crown Prince Cup: 2011–12, 2012–13
Rostov
 Russian Cup: 2013–14

References

External links
 

1988 births
Living people
South Korean footballers
South Korea international footballers
South Korean expatriate footballers
2011 AFC Asian Cup players
Incheon United FC players
Al Hilal SFC players
FC Rostov players
K League 1 players
Yoo Byung-soo
Yoo Byung-soo
Expatriate footballers in Saudi Arabia
South Korean expatriate sportspeople in Saudi Arabia
Expatriate footballers in Russia
South Korean expatriate sportspeople in Russia
Expatriate footballers in Thailand
South Korean expatriate sportspeople in Thailand
Yoo Byung-soo
Yoo Byung-soo
Russian Premier League players
Sportspeople from Daegu
Association football forwards
Saudi Professional League players